Archibald McMillan (1894 – 23 November 1917) was a Scottish professional footballer who played in the Scottish League for Ayr United as an outside left.

Personal life 
McMillan served as a private in the Argyll and Sutherland Highlanders during the First World War. In November 1917, he and his regiment were involved in an attack on Bourlon Ridge during the Battle of Cambrai. At some point between 21 and 23 November 1917, McMillan was fatally wounded at Fontaine-Notre-Dame and he died of his wounds on 23 November 1917. He was buried in Rocquigny-Equancourt Road British Cemetery.

Career statistics

References 

Scottish footballers
1917 deaths
British Army personnel of World War I
British military personnel killed in World War I
1894 births
Argyll and Sutherland Highlanders soldiers
Scottish Football League players
Ayr United F.C. players
People from Campbeltown
Association football outside forwards
Sportspeople from Argyll and Bute
Burials at Rocquigny-Equancourt Road British Cemetery